Krugloye is a rural locality (a village) in Semizerye Rural Settlement, Kaduysky District, Vologda Oblast, Russia. The population was 3 as of 2002. There are 2 streets.

Geography 
Krugloye is located 15 km east of Kaduy (the district's administrative centre) by road. Zaozerye is the nearest rural locality.

References 

Rural localities in Kaduysky District